Secinaro is a comune and town in the province of L'Aquila in the Abruzzo region of central Italy. It is located in the Aterno River valley, on the slopes of Monte Sirente.

See also
 Sirente crater

References

External links 
 

Cities and towns in Abruzzo